Ergoge Tesfaye (born 22 October 1978) is an Ethiopian politician who is the current Ministry of Women and Social Affairs. She previously severed as the Ministry of Labour and Skills Development from October 2018 -6 October 2021.

Early life 
Ergoge was born in Hosaena, Hadiya, Ethiopia and raised in Addis Ababa, and Hosaena. She was born to a teacher family, and attended her primary school in her home town, but left her home town when she was a second grader and resumed her education in capital of Ethiopia, Addis Abeba. As she completed grade 10, her family went back to Hossana, and this let Ergoge complete her secondary school in her home town.
As Ergoge completed her secondary school, she went back to Addis Ababa and joined Addis Ababa University, where she awarded Bachelor of Arts in Foreign Language and Literature. She also earned Master of Arts in Gender Studies, and Doctor of Philosophy in Social Anthropology from India.

Career 
After completing her BA in Foreign Language and Literature, Ergogie became an English teacher for two years in Gimbichu high school. Before becoming a Minister for Labor and Social Affairs, Ergoge served as a teacher and director of the Gender and HIV Protection office in Saint Mary's University (Ethiopia), and Research and Community Service Vice President at Wachamo University.

References 

1978 births
Living people
Ministers of Labor and Social Affairs of Ethiopia
Ethiopian politicians
People from Southern Nations, Nationalities, and Peoples' Region
21st-century Ethiopian politicians
21st-century Ethiopian women politicians